The 721st Operations Support Squadron (721 OSS) is a United States Space Force unit. Assigned to Space Operations Command's Space Delta 3, it provides training, intelligence, tactics, and operations support to the delta. Headquartered at Peterson Space Force Base, Colorado, it was activated on 10 October 2019 following the establishment of the 721st Operations Group which was later redesignated to Space Delta 3.

List of commanders 
 Lt Col Matthew S. Thompson, 10 October 2019
 Lt Col Etan D. Funches, 18 June 2021

See also 
 Space Delta 2

References

External links 
 

Military education and training in the United States
Squadrons of the United States Space Force